Katarína "Katka" Prokešová (born  in Bratislava) is a Slovak former individual and double-mini trampolinist, representing her nation at international competitions. 

She participated at the 2004 Summer Olympics, finishing 10th in the women's trampoline event. At the 2000 European Trampoline Championships she won the gold medal in the individual double-mini event. She competed at world championships, including at the 2001, 2005 and 2011 Trampoline World Championships, winning the bronze medal in the individual double-mini event in 2001.

References

External links

http://www.gymnastics.sk/wiw/prokesova.html
https://sport.sme.sk/c/1463058/prokesova-na-swedish-trampoline-open-desiata.html

1976 births
Living people
Slovak female trampolinists
Sportspeople from Bratislava
Gymnasts at the 2004 Summer Olympics
Olympic gymnasts of Slovakia
Competitors at the 2001 World Games